The LG GW620, also known as the LG Eve and the LG InTouch Max, is a smartphone manufactured by LG Electronics. It is the first smartphone from LG that runs the Android operating system.

According to LG's managing director in Levant, Kevin Cha, “This Android phone is just one of many smartphone models we plan to introduce worldwide in the years ahead.” In Canada, the LG GW620 is distributed by Rogers Wireless.

See also
List of Android devices
Galaxy Nexus

References

External links
 LG GW620 at PDAdb.net
 http://openetna.com/  open firmware project
 https://code.google.com/p/openeve Open firmware project for the LG GW620/KH5200

LG Electronics smartphones
Android (operating system) devices
Mobile phones introduced in 2009
Discontinued smartphones